

Preparation 
To face the 2017 season, the club prepared the team from November 2016 onwards. The management wanted to hire a head coach with a good record and good experience. Subangkit was the answer, and he signed a contract with PSIS Semarang on 30 November 2016. Subangkit said "I love a challenge and target, PSIS have the both of that, It's an attractive challenge furthermore PSIS Semarang have mission to promote to Liga1".

Transfer

In 
Transfer windows I
  Ferry Bagus Kurniawan (Persiharjo Unsa Azmi)
  Saddam Sudarma Hendra (Persiba Bantul)
  Juni Riyadi (PSIM Yogyakarta)
  Haudi Abdillah (PSCS Cilacap)
  Ruud Gullit S. Junus (Martapura FC)
  Imam Baihaqi (Celebest FC Palu)
  Erik Dwi Ermawansah (Madura United FC)
  Jawwad Jazil El Wafa (Gresik United)
  Ilham Arfil Haqq (Gresik United)
  Achmad Rezal (Bhayangkara FC)

Transfer windows II
  Nanang Wahyudi (Madiun Putra FC)
  Ali Khomaedi (Persekap Pasuruan)
  Adit Wafa (Persijap Jepara)
  Solihul Islam (Persibas Banyumas)
  Aldaier Makatindu (Madura F.C.)
  Andrid Wibawa (Persis Solo)
  Gatot Wahyudi (Persik Kendal)

Out 
Transfer windows I
  Ivan Febriyanto (PSIM Yogyakarta)
  Bayu Andra Cahyadi (Persis Solo)
  Herry Susilo (Persipur Purwodadi)
  Arif Yanggi Rahman Persik Kediri)
  Dedi Cahyono Putro (Persis Solo)
  Iwan Wahyudi (Persip Pekalongan)
  Ganjar Mukti (PS TNI)
  Syaiful Amar (Persab Brebes)
  Feri Ariawan (release)
  Andrianto Ariza (release)
  Dwi Chandra Rukmana (PSMS Medan)
  Akhsay Rismawanto (release)
  Vicky Melano (757 Kepri Jaya FC)

Transfer windows II
  Saddam Sudarma Hendra (release)
  Juni Riyadi (release)
  Imam Baihaqi (release)
  Dani Raharjianto (release)
  Johan Yoga Utama (release)
  Awan Setho Raharjo (Bhayangkara F.C./terminate a loan)

loan in

Loan Out

Squad 
(last update November 2017)

Result

2nd Stage

a quarter-finals

Semi-finals

3rd Place

References 

PSIS Semarang seasons
Indonesian football clubs 2017 season